Route 495, or Highway 495, can refer to:

Canada
New Brunswick Route 495

Japan
 Japan National Route 495

United States
  Interstate 495 (disambiguation)
  Maryland Route 495
  New Jersey Route 495
  New York State Route 495
  Puerto Rico Highway 495
 Texas:
  Texas State Highway 495
  Farm to Market Road 495 (former)